There are about 1,700 known moth species of Tanzania. The moths (mostly nocturnal) and butterflies (mostly diurnal) together make up the taxonomic order Lepidoptera.

This is a list of moth species which have been recorded from Tanzania.

Alucitidae
Alucita dohertyi (Walsingham, 1909)
Alucita ectomesa (Hering, 1917)
Alucita entoprocta (Hering, 1917)
Alucita hemicyclus (Hering, 1917)
Alucita isodina (Meyrick, 1920)

Anomoeotidae
Staphylinochrous meinickei Hering, 1928
Thermochrous neurophaea Hering, 1928

Arctiinae
Acantharctia aurivillii Bartel, 1903
Acantharctia nigrivena Rothschild, 1935
Acantharctia tenuifasciata Hampson, 1910
Acanthofrontia biannulata (Wichgraf, 1922)
Afrasura amaniensis (Cieslak & Häuser, 2006)
Afrasura neavi (Hampson, 1914)
Afrospilarctia flavida (Bartel, 1903)
Afrospilarctia lucida (Druce, 1898)
Alpenus investigatorum (Karsch, 1898)
Alpenus maculosa (Stoll, 1781)
Alpenus pardalina (Rothschild, 1910)
Alpenus schraderi (Rothschild, 1910)
Amata alicia (Butler, 1876)
Amata burtti (Distant, 1900)
Amata cerbera (Linnaeus, 1764)
Amata ceres (Oberthür, 1878)
Amata chloroscia (Hampson, 1901)
Amata chrysozona (Hampson, 1898)
Amata consimilis (Hampson, 1901)
Amata dilateralis (Hampson, 1898)
Amata discata (Druce, 1898)
Amata janenschi Seitz, 1926
Amata kuhlweini (Lefèbvre, 1832)
Amata miozona (Hampson, 1910)
Amata monticola (Aurivillius, 1910)
Amata nigricilia (Strand, 1912)
Amata phaeozona (Zerny, 1912)
Amata phoenicia (Hampson, 1898)
Amata rubritincta (Hampson, 1903)
Amerila affinis (Rothschild, 1910)
Amerila bipartita (Rothschild, 1910)
Amerila bubo (Walker, 1855)
Amerila carneola (Hampson, 1916)
Amerila fennia (Druce, 1887)
Amerila howardi (Pinhey, 1955)
Amerila lupia (Druce, 1887)
Amerila niveivitrea (Bartel, 1903)
Amerila phaedra Weymer, 1892
Amerila puella (Fabricius, 1793)
Amerila roseomarginata (Rothschild, 1910)
Amerila thermochroa (Hampson, 1916)
Amerila vidua (Cramer, 1780)
Amphicallia bellatrix (Dalman, 1823)
Amphicallia pactolicus (Butler, 1888)
Amphicallia quagga Strand, 1909
Amphicallia solai (Druce, 1907)
Amphicallia thelwalli (Druce, 1882)
Anaphosia astrigata Hampson, 1910
Apisa canescens Walker, 1855
Argina amanda (Boisduval, 1847)
Argina astrea (Drury, 1773)
Argina leonina (Walker, 1865)
Asura doa Kühne, 2007
Asura mutabilis Kühne, 2007
Asura sagenaria (Wallengren, 1860)
Balacra flavimacula Walker, 1856
Balacra nigripennis (Aurivillius, 1904)
Balacra preussi (Aurivillius, 1904)
Binna penicillata Walker, 1865
Caripodia chrysargyria Hampson, 1900
Ceryx hilda (Ehrmann, 1894)
Cragia distigmata (Hampson, 1901)
Creatonotos leucanioides Holland, 1893
Creatonotos punctivitta (Walker, 1854)
Cyana arenbergeri Karisch, 2003
Cyana nemasisha Roesler, 1990
Cyana pretoriae (Distant, 1897)
Cyana rejecta (Walker, 1854)
Dasyarctia grisea Gaede, 1923
Eilema albescens (Aurivillius, 1910)
Eilema bipartita Aurivillius, 1910
Eilema costimacula Aurivillius, 1910
Eilema marwitziana Strand, 1912
Eilema mesosticta Hampson, 1911
Eilema oblitterans (Felder, 1868)
Eilema peperita (Hampson, 1901)
Eilema polioplaga (Hampson, 1901)
Eilema pusilana Strand, 1912
Eilema stevensii (Holland, 1892)
Epilacydes scita (Walker, 1865)
Epitoxis duplicata Gaede, 1926
Estigmene ansorgei Rothschild, 1910
Estigmene ochreomarginata Bethune-Baker, 1909
Estigmene trivitta (Walker, 1855)
Euchromia amoena (Möschler, 1872)
Euchromia folletii (Guérin-Méneville, 1832)
Eyralpenus atricrures (Hampson, 1916)
Eyralpenus diplosticta (Hampson, 1900)
Eyralpenus inconspicua (Rothschild, 1910)
Eyralpenus meinhofi (Bartel, 1903)
Eyralpenus scioana (Oberthür, 1880)
Eyralpenus sublutea (Bartel, 1903)
Eyralpenus trifasciata (Holland, 1892)
Galtara doriae (Oberthür, 1880)
Hypersypnoides heinrichi Laporte, 1979
Ilemodes isogyna Romieux, 1935
Ischnarctia brunnescens Bartel, 1903
Ischnarctia cinerea (Pagenstecher, 1903)
Karschiola holoclera (Karsch, 1894)
Lamprosiella eborella (Boisduval, 1847)
Lepidilema unipectinata Aurivillius, 1910
Lepista pandula (Boisduval, 1847)
Lobilema conspersa Aurivillius, 1910
Macrosia fumeola (Walker, 1854)
Megalonycta forsteri Laporte, 1979
Metarctia atrivenata Kiriakoff, 1956
Metarctia collocalia Kiriakoff, 1957
Metarctia epimela (Kiriakoff, 1979)
Metarctia fulvia Hampson, 1901
Metarctia inconspicua Holland, 1892
Metarctia insignis Kiriakoff, 1959
Metarctia lateritia Herrich-Schäffer, 1855
Metarctia lindemannae Kiriakoff, 1961
Metarctia pavlitzkae (Kiriakoff, 1961)
Metarctia rubripuncta Hampson, 1898
Metarctia rufescens Walker, 1855
Metarctia seydeliana (Kiriakoff, 1953)
Micralarctia punctulatum (Wallengren, 1860)
Micralarctia semipura (Bartel, 1903)
Neuroxena ansorgei Kirby, 1896
Nyctemera apicalis (Walker, 1854)
Nyctemera insulare (Boisduval, 1833)
Nyctemera itokina (Aurivillius, 1904)
Nyctemera leuconoe Hopffer, 1857
Nyctemera rattrayi (Swinhoe, 1904)
Nyctemera restrictum (Butler, 1894)
Nyctemera transitella (Strand, 1909)
Nyctemera usambarae Oberthür, 1893
Ochrota asuraeformis (Strand, 1912)
Owambarctia unipuncta Kiriakoff, 1973
Paralacydes arborifera (Butler, 1875)
Paralacydes bivittata (Bartel, 1903)
Paralacydes decemmaculata (Rothschild, 1916)
Paralacydes fiorii (Berio, 1937)
Paralacydes ramosa (Hampson, 1907)
Paralacydes vocula (Stoll, 1790)
Paralpenus wintgensi (Strand, 1909)
Popoudina brosi Toulgoët, 1986
Pseudonaclia bifasciata Aurivillius, 1910
Pseudonaclia fasciata Gaede, 1926
Pseudothyretes perpusilla (Walker, 1856)
Pusiola elongata (Aurivillius, 1910)
Radiarctia jacksoni (Rothschild, 1910)
Radiarctia rhodesiana (Hampson, 1900)
Rhabdomarctia rubrilineata (Bethune-Baker, 1911)
Secusio sansibarensis Strand, 1909
Secusio strigata Walker, 1854
Seydelia ellioti (Butler, 1895)
Spilosoma affinis Bartel, 1903
Spilosoma albiventre Kiriakoff, 1963
Spilosoma atrivenata Rothschild, 1933
Spilosoma baxteri (Rothschild, 1910)
Spilosoma bipartita Rothschild, 1933
Spilosoma curvilinea Walker, 1855
Spilosoma lineata Walker, 1855
Spilosoma pales (Druce, 1910)
Spilosoma semihyalina Bartel, 1903
Spilosoma sublutescens Kiriakoff, 1958
Spilosoma unipuncta (Hampson, 1905)
Teracotona approximans (Rothschild, 1917)
Teracotona clara Holland, 1892
Teracotona euprepia Hampson, 1900
Teracotona homeyeri Rothschild, 1910
Teracotona latifasciata Carcasson, 1965
Teracotona melanocera (Hampson, 1920)
Teracotona pardalina Bartel, 1903
Teracotona rhodophaea (Walker, 1865)
Teracotona subapproximans Rothschild, 1933
Teracotona subterminata Hampson, 1901
Teracotona translucens (Grünberg, 1907)
Teracotona uhrikmeszarosi Svent-Ivany, 1942
Thumatha africana Kühne, 2007
Thyretes trichaetiformis Zerny, 1912
Utetheisa elata (Fabricius, 1798)
Utetheisa pulchella (Linnaeus, 1758)

Autostichidae
Turatia argillacea Gozmány, 2000

Brachodidae
Phycodes substriata Walsingham, 1891

Brahmaeidae
Dactyloceras catenigera (Karsch, 1895)
Dactyloceras maculata (Conte, 1911)
Dactyloceras neumayeri (Pagenstecher, 1885)
Dactyloceras vingerhoedti Bouyer, 2005
Dactyloceras widenmanni (Karsch, 1895)

Choreutidae
Anthophila flavimaculata (Walsingham, 1891)

Cosmopterigidae
Cosmopterix athesiae Huemer & Koster, 2006

Cossidae
Arctiocossus punctifera Gaede, 1929
Coryphodema ochracea Gaede, 1929
Eulophonotus elegans (Aurivillius, 1910)
Meharia semilactea (Warren & Rothschild, 1905)
Meharia tanganyikae Bradley, 1951
Nomima szunyoghyi (Gozmány, 1965)
Oreocossus kilimanjarensis (Holland, 1892)
Phragmataecia brunni Pagenstecher, 1892

Crambidae
Adelpherupa flavescens Hampson, 1919
Anania metaleuca (Hampson, 1913)
Ancylolomia melanella Hampson, 1919
Ancylolomia melanothoracia Hampson, 1919
Conotalis nigroradians (Mabille, 1900)
Cotachena smaragdina (Butler, 1875)
Crocidolomia pavonana (Fabricius, 1794)
Culladia achroellum (Mabille, 1900)
Euclasta varii Popescu-Gorj & Constantinescu, 1973
Glyphodes basifascialis Hampson, 1898
Heliothela ophideresana (Walker, 1863)
Nomophila brevispinalis Munroe, 1973
Nomophila noctuella ([Denis & Schiffermüller], 1775)
Parerupa africana (Aurivillius, 1910)
Patissa geminalis Hampson, 1919
Powysia rosealinea Maes, 2006
Prionapteryx alternalis Maes, 2002
Prionapteryx phaeomesa (Hampson, 1919)
Protinopalpa subclathrata Strand, 1911
Psammotis haematidea (Hampson, 1913)
Pyrausta centralis Maes, 2009
Pyrausta microdontaloides Maes, 2009
Pyrausta perparvula Maes, 2009
Pyrausta sanguifusalis Hampson, 1913

Drepanidae
Aethiopsestis mufindiae Watson, 1965
Gonoreta subtilis (Bryk, 1913)
Negera natalensis (Felder, 1874)

Elachistidae
Ethmia ballistis Meyrick, 1908
Ethmia taxiacta Meyrick, 1920

Epipyropidae
Epipyrops cerolestes Tams, 1947
Epipyrops epityraea Scheven, 1974

Eriocottidae
Compsoctena africanella (Strand, 1909)

Eupterotidae
Camerunia albida Aurivillius, 1901
Hibrildes crawshayi Butler, 1896
Hoplojana distincta Rothschild, 1917
Hoplojana indecisa (Aurivillius, 1901)
Hoplojana rhodoptera (Gerstaecker, 1871)
Jana eurymas Herrich-Schäffer, 1854
Janomima mariana (White, 1843)
Phiala alba Aurivillius, 1893
Phiala costipuncta (Herrich-Schäffer, 1855)
Phiala infuscata (Grünberg, 1907)
Stenoglene obtusus (Walker, 1864)
Stenoglene pira Druce, 1896

Gelechiidae
Anarsia agricola Walsingham, 1891
Brachmia septella (Zeller, 1852)
Dichomeris rhodophaea Meyrick, 1920
Pectinophora gossypiella (Saunders, 1844)
Ptilothyris crossoceros Meyrick, 1934
Trichotaphe chalybitis (Meyrick, 1920)

Geometridae
Acanthovalva bilineata (Warren, 1895)
Acidaliastis systema D. S. Fletcher, 1978
Adesmobathra ozoloides Prout, 1916
Allochrostes impunctata (Warren, 1897)
Antharmostes papilio Prout, 1912
Aphilopota exterritorialis (Strand, 1909)
Aphilopota foedata (Bastelberger, 1907)
Aphilopota semiusta (Distant, 1898)
Aphilopota triphasia Prout, 1954
Aphilopota viriditincta (Warren, 1905)
Archichlora rectilineata Carcasson, 1971
Ascotis reciprocaria (Walker, 1860)
Asthenotricha anisobapta Prout, 1932
Asthenotricha ansorgei Warren, 1899
Asthenotricha dentatissima Warren, 1899
Asthenotricha inutilis Warren, 1901
Asthenotricha pycnoconia Janse, 1933
Asthenotricha serraticornis Warren, 1902
Asthenotricha straba Prout, 1921
Biston abruptaria (Walker, 1869)
Biston homoclera (Prout, 1938)
Brachytrita cervinaria Swinhoe, 1904
Cacochloris ochrea (Warren, 1897)
Cartaletis libyssa (Hopffer, 1857)
Casilda lucidaria (Swinhoe, 1904)
Celidomphax analiplaga (Warren, 1905)
Chiasmia affinis (Warren, 1902)
Chiasmia assimilis (Warren, 1899)
Chiasmia butaria (Swinhoe, 1904)
Chiasmia costiguttata (Warren, 1899)
Chiasmia geminilinea (Prout, 1932)
Chiasmia inconspicua (Warren, 1897)
Chiasmia kilimanjarensis (Holland, 1892)
Chiasmia maculosa (Warren, 1899)
Chiasmia normata (Walker, 1861)
Chiasmia rectilinea (Warren, 1905)
Chiasmia rectistriaria (Herrich-Schäffer, 1854)
Chiasmia simplicilinea (Warren, 1905)
Chiasmia sororcula (Warren, 1897)
Chiasmia streniata (Guenée, 1858)
Chiasmia subcurvaria (Mabille, 1897)
Chiasmia umbrata (Warren, 1897)
Chiasmia umbratilis (Butler, 1875)
Chlorerythra rubriplaga Warren, 1895
Chlorissa albistrigulata (Warren, 1897)
Chlorissa attenuata (Walker, 1862)
Chloroclystis consocer Prout, 1937
Chloroclystis cryptolopha Prout, 1932
Chloroctenis conspersa Warren, 1909
Cleora munda (Warren, 1899)
Cleora rostella D. S. Fletcher, 1967
Cleora thyris D. S. Fletcher, 1967
Coenina aurivena Butler, 1898
Collix foraminata Guenée, 1858
Comostolopsis simplex Warren, 1902
Comostolopsis stillata (Felder & Rogenhofer, 1875)
Conolophia conscitaria (Walker, 1861)
Cyclophora paratropa (Prout, 1920)
Cyclophora unocula (Warren, 1897)
Derambila niphosphaeras (Prout, 1934)
Disclisioprocta natalata (Walker, 1862)
Dithecodes ornithospila (Prout, 1911)
Drepanogynis johnstonei (Prout, 1938)
Drepanogynis lacuum (Prout, 1938)
Ecpetala obtusa (Warren, 1902)
Ectropis anisa Prout, 1915
Ectropis delosaria (Walker, 1862)
Ectropis gozmanyi D. S. Fletcher, 1978
Ectropis ikonda Herbulot, 1981
Ectropis ocellata Warren, 1902
Epigynopteryx africana (Aurivillius, 1910)
Epigynopteryx maeviaria (Guenée, 1858)
Epirrhoe annulifera (Warren, 1902)
Erastria albosignata (Walker, 1863)
Erastria leucicolor (Butler, 1875)
Erastria madecassaria (Boisduval, 1833)
Ereunetea reussi Gaede, 1914
Eucrostes disparata Walker, 1861
Euexia percnopus Prout, 1915
Eupithecia celatisigna (Warren, 1902)
Eupithecia devestita (Warren, 1899)
Eupithecia dilucida (Warren, 1899)
Eupithecia proflua Prout, 1932
Eupithecia regulosa (Warren, 1902)
Eupithecia rigida Swinhoe, 1892
Eupithecia salti D. S. Fletcher, 1951
Eupithecia semipallida Janse, 1933
Eupithecia tricuspis Prout, 1932
Eupithecia undiculata Prout, 1932
Haplolabida monticolata (Aurivillius, 1910)
Haplolabida sjostedti (Aurivillius, 1910)
Heterorachis dichorda Prout, 1915
Hierochthonia migrata Prout, 1930
Hydrelia ericinella Aurivillius 1910
Hydrelia costalis Aurivillius, 1910
Hypsometra ericinellae Aurivillius, 1910
Idaea auriflua (Warren, 1902)
Idaea heres (Prout, 1932)
Idaea macrostyla (Warren, 1900)
Idaea umbricosta (Prout, 1913)
Idiochlora subrufibasis (Prout, 1930)
Idiodes flexilinea (Warren, 1898)
Isturgia catalaunaria (Guenée, 1858)
Isturgia deerraria (Walker, 1861)
Isturgia triseriata (Prout, 1926)
Lophorrhachia burdoni Townsend, 1958
Microligia dolosa Warren, 1897
Mimoclystia cancellata (Warren, 1899)
Mimoclystia corticearia (Aurivillius, 1910)
Mixocera albistrigata (Pagenstecher, 1893)
Neurotoca notata Warren, 1897
Oaracta maculata (Warren, 1897)
Obolcola petronaria (Guenée, 1858)
Odontopera azelinaria (Swinhoe, 1904)
Omizodes rubrifasciata (Butler, 1896)
Omphalucha brunnea (Warren, 1899)
Omphax plantaria Guenée, 1858
Oreometra vittata Aurivillius, 1910
Orthonama obstipata (Fabricius, 1794)
Pachypalpella subalbata (Warren, 1900)
Paraptychodes kedar (Druce, 1896)
Paraptychodes tenuis (Butler, 1878)
Petovia marginata Walker, 1854
Piercia fumitacta (Warren, 1903)
Piercia prasinaria (Warren, 1901)
Piercia subrufaria (Warren, 1903)
Piercia subterlimbata (Prout, 1917)
Pingasa distensaria (Walker, 1860)
Pitthea trifasciata Dewitz, 1881
Prasinocyma loveridgei Prout, 1926
Prasinocyma permitis Prout, 1932
Problepsis digammata Kirby, 1896
Protosteira spectabilis (Warren, 1899)
Pseudolarentia monosticta (Butler, 1894)
Pseudosoloe thalassina (Warren, 1909)
Racotis apodosima Prout, 1931
Racotis squalida (Butler, 1878)
Racotis zebrina Warren, 1899
Rheumaptera relicta (Herbulot, 1953)
Rhodesia alboviridata (Saalmüller, 1880)
Rhodometra sacraria (Linnaeus, 1767)
Rhodophthitus anamesa (Prout, 1915)
Rhodophthitus commaculata (Warren, 1897)
Rhodophthitus rudicornis (Butler, 1898)
Rhodophthitus tricoloraria (Mabille, 1890)
Scardamia maculata Warren, 1897
Scopula agrapta (Warren, 1902)
Scopula argentidisca (Warren, 1902)
Scopula curvimargo (Warren, 1900)
Scopula erinaria (Swinhoe, 1904)
Scopula internata (Guenée, 1857)
Scopula lactaria (Walker, 1861)
Scopula latitans Prout, 1920
Scopula minorata (Boisduval, 1833)
Scopula natalica (Butler, 1875)
Scopula rufinubes (Warren, 1900)
Scopula sagittilinea (Warren, 1897)
Scopula serena Prout, 1920
Scopula umbratilinea (Warren, 1901)
Scotopteryx nictitaria (Herrich-Schäffer, 1855)
Somatina virginalis Prout, 1917
Thalassodes quadraria Guenée, 1857
Traminda acuta (Warren, 1897)
Traminda neptunaria (Guenée, 1858)
Traminda vividaria (Walker, 1861)
Trimetopia aetheraria Guenée, 1858
Triphosa tritocelidata Aurivillius, 1910
Victoria triplaga Prout, 1915
Xanthisthisa tarsispina (Warren, 1901)
Xanthorhoe albodivisaria (Aurivillius 1910)
Xanthorhoe alluaudi (Prout, 1932)
Xanthorhoe argenteolineata (Aurivillius, 1910)
Xanthorhoe belgarum Herbulot, 1981
Xanthorhoe exorista Prout, 1922
Xanthorhoe heteromorpha (Hampson, 1909)
Xanthorhoe procne (Fawcett, 1916)
Xanthorhoe transcissa (Warren, 1902)
Xanthorhoe transjugata Prout, 1923
Xanthorhoe trientata (Warren, 1901)
Xanthorhoe tuta Herbulot, 1981
Xenochroma candidata Warren, 1902
Zamarada acalantis Herbulot, 2001
Zamarada acosmeta Prout, 1921
Zamarada acrochra Prout, 1928
Zamarada aequilumata D. S. Fletcher, 1974
Zamarada amelga D. S. Fletcher, 1974
Zamarada amicta Prout, 1915
Zamarada ansorgei Warren, 1897
Zamarada arguta D. S. Fletcher, 1974
Zamarada bastelbergeri Gaede, 1915
Zamarada bathyscaphes Prout, 1912
Zamarada calypso Prout, 1926
Zamarada candelabra D. S. Fletcher, 1974
Zamarada chrysopa D. S. Fletcher, 1974
Zamarada cinnamomata D. S. Fletcher, 1978
Zamarada collarti Debauche, 1938
Zamarada crystallophana Mabille, 1900
Zamarada cucharita D. S. Fletcher, 1974
Zamarada cydippe Herbulot, 1954
Zamarada deceptrix Warren, 1914
Zamarada delosis D. S. Fletcher, 1974
Zamarada delta D. S. Fletcher, 1974
Zamarada denticatella Prout, 1922
Zamarada dentigera Warren, 1909
Zamarada differens Bastelberger, 1907
Zamarada dorsiplaga Prout, 1922
Zamarada erugata D. S. Fletcher, 1974
Zamarada euerces Prout, 1928
Zamarada euphrosyne Oberthür, 1912
Zamarada eurygnathus D. S. Fletcher, 1974
Zamarada euterpina Oberthür, 1912
Zamarada excavata Bethune-Baker, 1913
Zamarada fessa Prout, 1912
Zamarada flavicaput Warren, 1901
Zamarada gamma D. S. Fletcher, 1958
Zamarada glareosa Bastelberger, 1909
Zamarada hyalinaria (Guenée, 1857)
Zamarada ignicosta Prout, 1912
Zamarada ilma Prout, 1922
Zamarada iobathra Prout, 1932
Zamarada keraia D. S. Fletcher, 1974
Zamarada kiellandi Aarvik & Bjørnstad, 2007
Zamarada labifera Prout, 1915
Zamarada lequeuxi Herbulot, 1983
Zamarada lima D. S. Fletcher, 1974
Zamarada loleza Aarvik & Bjørnstad, 2007
Zamarada longidens D. S. Fletcher, 1963
Zamarada mashariki Aarvik & Bjørnstad, 2007
Zamarada mckameyi Aarvik & Bjørnstad, 2007
Zamarada melasma D. S. Fletcher, 1974
Zamarada melpomene Oberthür, 1912
Zamarada metrioscaphes Prout, 1912
Zamarada micropomene Aarvik & Bjørnstad, 2007
Zamarada montana Herbulot, 1979
Zamarada musomae Aarvik & Bjørnstad, 2007
Zamarada ndogo Aarvik & Bjørnstad, 2007
Zamarada ochrata Warren, 1902
Zamarada ordinaria Bethune-Baker, 1913
Zamarada paxilla D. S. Fletcher, 1974
Zamarada phaeozona Hampson, 1909
Zamarada phratra D. S. Fletcher, 1978
Zamarada pinheyi D. S. Fletcher, 1956
Zamarada plana Bastelberger, 1909
Zamarada platycephala D. S. Fletcher, 1974
Zamarada polyctemon Prout, 1932
Zamarada pringlei D. S. Fletcher, 1974
Zamarada prolata D. S. Fletcher, 1974
Zamarada psectra D. S. Fletcher, 1974
Zamarada psi D. S. Fletcher, 1974
Zamarada purimargo Prout, 1912
Zamarada reflexaria (Walker, 1863)
Zamarada rhamphis D. S. Fletcher, 1974
Zamarada ruandana Herbulot, 1983
Zamarada rubrifascia Pinhey, 1962
Zamarada rufilinearia Swinhoe, 1904
Zamarada saburra D. S. Fletcher, 1974
Zamarada scintillans Bastelberger, 1909
Zamarada seydeli D. S. Fletcher, 1974
Zamarada torrida D. S. Fletcher, 1974
Zamarada tristriga Aarvik & Bjørnstad, 2007
Zamarada tristrigoides Aarvik & Bjørnstad, 2007
Zamarada unisona D. S. Fletcher, 1974
Zamarada usambarae Aarvik & Bjørnstad, 2007
Zamarada usondo Aarvik & Bjørnstad, 2007
Zamarada uzungwae Aarvik & Bjørnstad, 2007
Zamarada varii D. S. Fletcher, 1974
Zamarada variola D. S. Fletcher, 1974
Zamarada vulpina Warren, 1897
Zygophyxia roseocincta (Warren, 1899)

Gracillariidae
Acrocercops bifasciata (Walsingham, 1891)
Caloptilia ingrata Triberti, 1989
Caloptilia octopunctata (Turner, 1894)
Corythoxestis aletreuta (Meyrick, 1936)
Cremastobombycia morogorene de Prins, 2012
Phodoryctis caerulea (Meyrick, 1912)
Phyllocnistis citrella Stainton, 1856
Phyllonorycter aarviki de Prins, 2012
Phyllonorycter maererei de Prins, 2012
Phyllonorycter mwatawalai de Prins, 2012

Hepialidae
Afrotheora brevivalva Nielsen & Scoble, 1986
Afrotheora thermodes (Meyrick, 1921)
Antihepialus keniae (Holland, 1892)
Eudalaca aequifascia (Gaede, 1930)
Eudalaca zernyi (Viette, 1950)
Gorgopi caffra Walker, 1856
Gorgopi libania (Stoll, 1781)
Gorgopi salti Tams, 1952
Gorgopi tanganyikaensis Viette, 1950

Himantopteridae
Doratopteryx steniptera Hampson, 1920
Semioptila fulveolans (Mabille, 1897)
Semioptila latifulva Hampson, 1920

Lasiocampidae
Anadiasa hartigi Szent-Ivány, 1942
Beralade bistrigata Strand, 1909
Beralade continua Aurivillius, 1905
Beralade niphoessa Strand, 1909
Bombycomorpha bifascia (Walker, 1855)
Bombycopsis nigrovittata Aurivillius, 1927
Bombycopsis venosa (Butler, 1895)
Braura elgonensis (Kruck, 1940)
Braura ligniclusa (Walker, 1865)
Braura truncatum (Walker, 1855)
Catalebeda strandi Hering, 1927
Cheligium choerocampoides (Holland, 1893)
Chionopsyche montana Aurivillius, 1909
Chrysopsyche antennifera Strand, 1912
Chrysopsyche lutulenta Tams, 1923
Cleopatrina bilinea (Walker, 1855)
Cleopatrina phocea (Druce, 1887)
Dinometa maputuana (Wichgraf, 1906)
Dollmania purpurascens (Aurivillius, 1909)
Epicnapteroides lobata Strand, 1912
Epitrabala nyassana (Aurivillius, 1909)
Eucraera koellikerii (Dewitz, 1881)
Eutricha morosa (Walker, 1865)
Euwallengrenia reducta (Walker, 1855)
Gonobombyx angulata Aurivillius, 1893
Gonometa postica Walker, 1855
Gonometa rufobrunnea Aurivillius, 1922
Grammodora nigrolineata (Aurivillius, 1895)
Grellada imitans (Aurivillius, 1893)
Laeliopsis maculigera Strand, 1913
Lechriolepis flavomarginata Aurivillius, 1927
Lechriolepis griseola Aurivillius, 1927
Lechriolepis ochraceola Strand, 1912
Lechriolepis tessmanni Strand, 1912
Leipoxais acharis Hering, 1928
Leipoxais adoxa Hering, 1928
Leipoxais humfreyi Aurivillius, 1915
Leipoxais marginepunctata Holland, 1893
Marmonna gella Zolotuhin & Prozorov, 2010
Marmonna marmorata Zolotuhin & Prozorov, 2010
Marmonna murphyi Zolotuhin & Prozorov, 2010
Metajana kilwicola (Strand, 1912)
Metajana marshalli Aurivillius, 1909
Mimopacha gerstaeckerii (Dewitz, 1881)
Mimopacha tripunctata (Aurivillius, 1905)
Morongea arnoldi (Aurivillius, 1909)
Morongea elfiora Zolotuhin & Prozorov, 2010
Muzunguja rectilineata (Aurivillius, 1900)
Odontocheilopteryx dollmani Tams, 1930
Odontocheilopteryx myxa Wallengren, 1860
Odontocheilopteryx scilla Gurkovich & Zolotuhin, 2009
Odontopacha fenestrata Aurivillius, 1909
Opisthodontia varezhka Zolotuhin & Prozorov, 2010
Pachytrina crestalina Zolotuhin & Gurkovich, 2009
Pachytrina honrathii (Dewitz, 1881)
Pachytrina philargyria (Hering, 1928)
Pachytrina verba Zolotuhin & Gurkovich, 2009
Pachytrina wenigina Zolotuhin & Gurkovich, 2009
Pallastica lateritia (Hering, 1928)
Pallastica litlura Zolotuhin & Gurukovich, 2009
Pallastica meloui (Riel, 1909)
Pallastica pallens (Bethune-Baker, 1908)
Pallastica redissa Zolotuhin & Gurkovich, 2009
Philotherma grisea Aurivillius, 1914
Philotherma rectilinea Strand, 1912
Philotherma rosa (Druce, 1887)
Philotherma rufescens Wichgraf, 1921
Philotherma simplex Wichgraf, 1914
Pseudolyra cervina (Aurivillius, 1905)
Pseudolyra megista Tams, 1931
Pseudometa choba (Druce, 1899)
Pseudometa punctipennis (Strand, 1912)
Rhinobombyx cuneata Aurivillius, 1879
Schausinna affinis Aurivillius, 1910
Sena donaldsoni (Holland, 1901)
Sonitha lila Zolotuhin & Prozorov, 2010
Sophyrita argibasis (Mabille, 1893)
Stenophatna accolita Zolotuhin & Prozorov, 2010
Stenophatna cymographa (Hampson, 1910)
Stenophatna marshalli Aurivillius, 1909
Stenophatna rothschildi (Tams, 1936)
Stoermeriana abyssinicum (Aurivillius, 1908)
Stoermeriana fusca (Aurivillius, 1905)
Stoermeriana graberi (Dewitz, 1881)
Stoermeriana sjostedti (Aurivillius, 1902)
Streblote madibirense (Wichgraf, 1921)
Streblote polydora (Druce, 1887)
Trabala charon Druce, 1910
Trichopisthia igneotincta (Aurivillius, 1909)

Lecithoceridae
Cophomantella bifrenata (Meyrick, 1921)
Cophomantella cyclopodes (Meyrick, 1922)
Odites armilligera Meyrick, 1922
Protolychnis maculata (Walsingham, 1881)

Lemoniidae
Sabalia jacksoni Sharpe, 1890
Sabalia picarina Walker, 1865
Sabalia sericaria (Weymer, 1896)
Sabalia tippelskirchi Karsch, 1898

Limacodidae
Afrobirthama flaccidia (Druce, 1899)
Altha basalis West, 1940
Birthama basibrunnea Swinhoe, 1904
Chrysopoloma isabellina Aurivillius, 1895
Cosuma flavimacula West, 1940
Cosuma radiata Carcasson, 1965
Ctenolita zernyi Hering, 1949
Delorhachis kilosa West, 1940
Halseyia angustilinea (Hering, 1937)
Halseyia incisa (Hering, 1937)
Halseyia lacides (Druce, 1899)
Halseyia rufibasalis (Hering, 1928)
Latoia urda (Druce, 1887)
Latoiola bifascia Janse, 1964
Lepidorytis sulcata Aurivillius, 1900
Natada caliginosa West, 1940
Niphadolepis alianta Karsch, 1899
Niphadolepis elegans Wichgraf, 1921
Omocena songeana West, 1940
Parapluda invitabilis (Wallengren, 1860)
Parasa costalis West, 1940
Parasa lanceolata Hering, 1928
Scotinocerides conspurcata (Aurivillius, 1895)
Scotinocerides fasciata Hering, 1937
Scotinocerides sigma Hering, 1937
Scotinochroa charopocelis Tams, 1929
Taeda aetitis Wallengren, 1863
Taeda prasina Butler, 1896
Trogocrada atmota Janse, 1964
Zinara bilineata Hering, 1928

Lymantriidae
Abynotha meinickei Hering, 1926
Aclonophlebia civilis Hering, 1926
Aclonophlebia lugardi (Swinhoe, 1903)
Aclonophlebia lymantrioides Hering, 1926
Argyrostagma niobe (Weymer, 1896)
Aroa discalis Walker, 1855
Aroa melanoleuca Hampson, 1905
Aroa pampoecila Collenette, 1930
Aroa tomisa Druce, 1896
Barlowia charax (Druce, 1896)
Bracharoa charax (Druce, 1896)
Bracharoa mixta (Snellen, 1872)
Bracharoa reducta Hering, 1926
Cadurca dianeura Hering, 1928
Casama intermissa (Hering, 1926)
Chrysocyma mesopotamia Hampson, 1905
Conigephyra leucoptera (Hering, 1926)
Conigephyra pallidula (Hering, 1926)
Conigephyra splendida (Hering, 1926)
Cropera sericea (Hampson, 1910)
Cropera testacea Walker, 1855
Cropera unipunctata Wichgraf, 1921
Crorema adspersa (Herrich-Schäffer, 1854)
Crorema evanescens (Hampson, 1910)
Crorema fulvinotata (Butler, 1893)
Dasychira albicostata (Holland, 1893)
Dasychira barbara Hering, 1926
Dasychira daphne Hering, 1926
Dasychira daphnoides Hering, 1926
Dasychira hastifera Hering, 1926
Dasychira mkattana Strand, 1912
Dasychira nebulifera Hering, 1926
Dasychira nigerrima Hering, 1926
Dasychira polia Hering, 1926
Dasychira prospera Hering, 1926
Dasychira punctifera (Walker, 1857)
Dasychira scotina Hering, 1926
Dasychira stegmanni Grünberg, 1910
Dasychira subochracea Aurivillius, 1910
Eudasychira amata (Hering, 1926)
Eudasychira bokuma (Collenette, 1960)
Eudasychira georgiana (Fawcett, 1900)
Eudasychira metathermes (Hampson, 1905)
Eudasychira poliotis (Hampson, 1910)
Euproctis areolata Hering, 1928
Euproctis beato Bryk, 1934
Euproctis bigutta Holland, 1893
Euproctis multidentata Hering, 1926
Euproctis pallida (Kirby, 1896)
Euproctis producta (Walker, 1863)
Euproctis sericaria (Tams, 1924)
Euproctoides eddela (Swinhoe, 1903)
Hemerophanes diatoma (Hering, 1926)
Hemerophanes libyra (Druce, 1896)
Hemerophanes litigiosa (Hering, 1926)
Heteronygmia dissimilis Aurivillius, 1910
Homochira rendalli (Distant, 1897)
Knappetra fasciata (Walker, 1855)
Lacipa floridula (Hering, 1926)
Lacipa melanosticta Hampson, 1910
Lacipa pseudolacipa Hering, 1926
Lacipa quadripunctata Dewitz, 1881
Laelia amaura Hering, 1926
Laelia extorta (Distant, 1897)
Laelia extrema Hering, 1926
Laelia fracta Schaus & Clements, 1893
Laelia gephyra (Hering, 1926)
Laelia janenschi Hering, 1926
Laelia mediofasciata (Hering, 1926)
Laelia ordinata (Karsch, 1895)
Laelia phenax (Collenette, 1932)
Laelia rogersi Bethune-Baker, 1913
Laelia subrosea (Walker, 1855)
Leptaroa deleta Hering, 1926
Leptaroa ochricoloria Strand, 1911
Leptaroa paupera Hering, 1926
Leucoma discissa (Grünberg, 1910)
Leucoma maria (Kirby, 1896)
Leucoma parva (Plötz, 1880)
Leucoma vosseleri Grünberg, 1907
Leucoma xanthocephala (Hering, 1926)
Lymantria pruinosa Hering, 1927
Marblepsis tiphia (Swinhoe, 1903)
Ogoa fuscovenata Wichgraf, 1922
Ogoa simplex Walker, 1856
Olapa nigricosta Hampson, 1905
Olapa tavetensis (Holland, 1892)
Otroeda vesperina Walker, 1854
Palasea marwitzi Grünberg, 1907
Palasea miniata Grünberg, 1907
Pirga pellucida Wichgraf, 1922
Pirga weisei Karsch, 1900
Pirgula atrinotata (Butler, 1897)
Polymona inaffinis Hering, 1926
Ruanda aetheria Strand, 1909
Schalidomitra ambages Strand, 1911
Stracena bananae (Butler, 1897)
Stracena pellucida Grünberg, 1907
Stracena tavetensis (Holland, 1892)
Stracilla translucida (Oberthür, 1880)

Metarbelidae
Bjoernstadia kasuluensis Lehmann, 2012
Kroonia murphyi Lehmann, 2010
Kroonia natalica (Hampson, 1910)
Lebedodes ianrobertsoni Lehmann, 2009
Lebedodes jeanneli Le Cerf, 1914
Lebedodes leifaarviki Lehmann, 2009
Lebedodes violascens Gaede, 1929
Lebedodes willihaberlandi Lehmann, 2008
Marshalliana jansei Gaede, 1929
Metarbela abdulrahmani Lehmann, 2008
Metarbela arcifera (Hampson, 1909)
Metarbela chidzingai Lehmann, 2008
Metarbela erecta Gaede, 1929
Metarbela latifasciata Gaede, 1929
Metarbela lornadepewae Lehmann, 2009
Metarbela plagifera Gaede, 1929
Metarbela triangularis Gaede, 1929
Ortharbela cliftoni Lehmann, 2009
Ortharbela guttata Aurivillius, 1910
Ortharbela jurateae Lehmann, 2009
Ortharbela sommerlattei Lehmann, 2008
Paralebedella estherae Lehmann, 2008
Salagena arcys D. S. Fletcher, 1968
Salagena tessellata Distant, 1897
Teragra quadrangula Gaede, 1929

Micronoctuidae
Micronola yemeni Fibiger, 2011

Noctuidae
Achaea catella Guenée, 1852
Achaea catocaloides Guenée, 1852
Achaea chrysopera Druce, 1912
Achaea dasybasis Hampson, 1913
Achaea lienardi (Boisduval, 1833)
Achaea mercatoria (Fabricius, 1775)
Achaea nigristriata Laporte, 1979
Achaea praestans (Guenée, 1852)
Acontia aarviki Hacker, Legrain & Fibiger, 2008
Acontia antica Walker, 1862
Acontia atripars Hampson, 1914
Acontia aurelia Hacker, Legrain & Fibiger, 2008
Acontia basifera Walker, 1857
Acontia bellula Hacker, Legrain & Fibiger, 2010
Acontia binominata (Butler, 1892)
Acontia caeruleopicta Hampson, 1916
Acontia caffraria (Cramer, 1777)
Acontia callima Bethune-Baker, 1911
Acontia carnescens (Hampson, 1910)
Acontia conifrons (Aurivillius, 1879)
Acontia dichroa (Hampson, 1914)
Acontia discoidea Hopffer, 1857
Acontia discoidoides Hacker, Legrain & Fibiger, 2008
Acontia ectorrida (Hampson, 1916)
Acontia florentissima Hacker, Legrain & Fibiger, 2008
Acontia fuscoalba Hacker, Legrain & Fibiger, 2010
Acontia guttifera Felder & Rogenhofer, 1874
Acontia hampsoni Hacker, Legrain & Fibiger, 2008
Acontia hemixanthia (Hampson, 1910)
Acontia imitatrix Wallengren, 1856
Acontia insocia (Walker, 1857)
Acontia karachiensis Swinhoe, 1889
Acontia lanzai (Berio, 1985)
Acontia melaphora (Hampson, 1910)
Acontia miogona (Hampson, 1916)
Acontia natalis (Guenée, 1852)
Acontia nephele Hampson, 1911
Acontia niphogona (Hampson, 1909)
Acontia notha Hacker, Legrain & Fibiger, 2010
Acontia nubila Hampson, 1910
Acontia obliqua Hacker, Legrain & Fibiger, 2010
Acontia opalinoides Guenée, 1852
Acontia paraalba Hacker, Legrain & Fibiger, 2010
Acontia porphyrea (Butler, 1898)
Acontia praealba Hacker, Legrain & Fibiger, 2010
Acontia purpurata Hacker, Legrain & Fibiger, 2010
Acontia schreieri Hacker, Legrain & Fibiger, 2010
Acontia secta Guenée, 1852
Acontia simo Wallengren, 1860
Acontia sublactea Hacker, Legrain & Fibiger, 2008
Acontia subnotha Hacker, Legrain & Fibiger, 2010
Acontia szunyoghyi Hacker, Legrain & Fibiger, 2010
Acontia tanzaniae Hacker, Legrain & Fibiger, 2010
Acontia transfigurata Wallengren, 1856
Acontia trimaculata Aurivillius, 1879
Acontia wahlbergi Wallengren, 1856
Acontia wiltshirei Hacker, Legrain & Fibiger, 2008
Adisura bella Gaede, 1915
Aegocera rectilinea Boisduval, 1836
Aletopus imperialis Jordan, 1926
Amazonides asciodes Berio, 1972
Amazonides bioculata Berio, 1974
Amazonides intermedia Berio, 1972
Andobana multipunctata (Druce, 1899)
Aspidifrontia biarcuata Berio, 1964
Aspidifrontia oblata Berio, 1973
Aspidifrontia semiarcuata Berio, 1973
Aspidifrontia tanganykae Berio, 1964
Athetis pectinifer (Aurivillius, 1910)
Attatha ethiopica Hampson, 1910
Audea zimmeri Berio, 1954
Brevipecten cornuta Hampson, 1902
Brevipecten tessenei Berio, 1939
Calesia nigriannulata Hampson, 1926
Calliodes pretiosissima Holland, 1892
Callopistria latreillei (Duponchel, 1827)
Callopistria maillardi (Guenée, 1862)
Cerynea tetramelanosticta Berio, 1954
Chaetostephana rendalli (Rothschild, 1896)
Chalciope delta (Boisduval, 1833)
Charitosemia geraldi (Kirby, 1896)
Chlumetia cana Hampson, 1912
Chrysodeixis acuta (Walker, [1858])
Colbusa euclidica Walker, 1865
Crameria amabilis (Drury, 1773)
Ctenoplusia limbirena (Guenée, 1852)
Cucullia chrysota Hampson, 1902
Cucullia dallolmoi Berio, 1973
Cucullia ikondae Berio, 1973
Cucullia prolai Berio, 1956
Cuneisigna obstans (Walker, 1858)
Cyligramma conradsi Berio, 1954
Cyligramma latona (Cramer, 1775)
Cyligramma limacina (Guérin-Méneville, 1832)
Cyligramma magus (Guérin-Méneville, [1844])
Digama africana Swinhoe, 1907
Digama daressalamica Strand, 1911
Digama lithosioides Swinhoe, 1907
Dysgonia derogans (Walker, 1858)
Dysgonia torrida (Guenée, 1852)
Egybolis vaillantina (Stoll, 1790)
Entomogramma pardus Guenée, 1852
Erebus walkeri (Butler, 1875)
Ericeia lituraria (Saalmüller, 1880)
Ethiopica inornata Berio, 1975
Eublemma anachoresis (Wallengren, 1863)
Eublemma perobliqua Hampson, 1910
Eublemma rubripuncta (Hampson, 1902)
Eudocima materna (Linnaeus, 1767)
Euneophlebia spatulata Berio, 1972
Eustrotia decissima (Walker, 1865)
Eutelia amatrix Walker, 1858
Eutelia polychorda Hampson, 1902
Feliniopsis africana (Schaus & Clements, 1893)
Feliniopsis annosa (Viette, 1963)
Feliniopsis connivens (Felder & Rogenhofer, 1874)
Feliniopsis consummata (Walker, 1857)
Feliniopsis duponti (Laporte, 1974)
Feliniopsis gueneei (Laporte, 1973)
Feliniopsis hosplitoides (Laporte, 1979)
Feliniopsis kipengerensis Hacker & Fibiger, 2007
Feliniopsis knudlarseni Hacker & Fibiger, 2007
Feliniopsis laportei Hacker & Fibiger, 2007
Feliniopsis nigribarbata (Hampson, 1908)
Feliniopsis rufigiji Hacker & Fibiger, 2007
Feliniopsis satellitis (Berio, 1974)
Feliniopsis subsagula (D. S. Fletcher, 1961)
Feliniopsis talhouki (Wiltshire, 1983)
Gesonia obeditalis Walker, 1859
Grammodes geometrica (Fabricius, 1775)
Grammodes stolida (Fabricius, 1775)
Heliocheilus thomalae (Gaede, 1915)
Heliophisma catocalina Holland, 1894
Heraclia africana (Butler, 1875)
Heraclia limbomaculata (Strand, 1909)
Heraclia mozambica (Mabille, 1890)
Heraclia perdix (Druce, 1887)
Heraclia superba (Butler, 1875)
Heraclia xanthopyga (Mabille, 1890)
Heraclia zenkeri (Karsch, 1895)
Hespagarista caudata (Dewitz, 1879)
Hespagarista eburnea Jordan, 1915
Hespagarista echione (Boisduval, 1847)
Hiccoda roseitincta Hampson, 1920
Honeyia burmeisteri Hacker & Fibiger, 2007
Honeyia clearchus (Fawcett, 1916)
Hypena abyssinialis Guenée, 1854
Hypena striolalis Aurivillius, 1910
Hypocala deflorata (Fabricius, 1794)
Hypopyra africana (Kirby, 1896)
Hypopyra allardi (Oberthür, 1878)
Hypopyra capensis Herrich-Schäffer, 1854
Leucania nebulosa Hampson, 1902
Leucovis alba (Rothschild, 1897)
Lyncestoides unilinea (Swinhoe, 1885)
Marcipa mediana Hampson, 1926
Marcipalina tanzaniensis (Pelletier, 1975)
Masalia albipuncta (Hampson, 1910)
Masalia beatrix (Moore, 1881)
Masalia bimaculata (Moore, 1888)
Masalia disticta (Hampson, 1902)
Masalia flavistrigata (Hampson, 1903)
Masalia galatheae (Wallengren, 1856)
Masalia leucosticta (Hampson, 1902)
Masalia mittoni (Pinhey, 1956)
Masalia transvaalica (Distant, 1902)
Matopo actinophora Hampson, 1909
Medlerana bukobaenensis Laporte, 1979
Mentaxya albifrons (Geyer, 1837)
Mentaxya ignicollis (Walker, 1857)
Mesoligia kettlewelli Wiltshire, 1983
Micraxylia annulus Berio, 1972
Micraxylia gigas Berio, 1972
Mocis frugalis (Fabricius, 1775)
Mocis mayeri (Boisduval, 1833)
Mocis undata (Fabricius, 1775)
Nyodes kilimandjaronis Laporte, 1979
Oediplexia mesophaea Hampson, 1908
Ogovia tavetensis Holland, 1892
Omphaloceps daria (Druce, 1895)
Ophiusa tirhaca (Cramer, 1777)
Oraesia emarginata (Fabricius, 1794)
Oraesia provocans Walker, [1858]
Oraesia wintgensi (Strand, 1909)
Ozarba accincta (Distant, 1898)
Ozarba divisa Gaede, 1916
Ozarba implicata Berio, 1940
Ozarba morstatti Berio, 1938
Pandesma quenavadi Guenée, 1852
Paraegocera confluens (Weymer, 1892)
Pericyma metaleuca Hampson, 1913
Phaegorista bisignibasis Prout, 1918
Phaegorista euryanassa (Druce, 1887)
Phaegorista formosa Butler, 1877
Phaegorista leucomelas (Herrich-Schäffer, 1855)
Plecoptera diplosticha Hampson, 1926
Plecoptera reversa (Walker, 1865)
Plusiopalpa dichora Holland, 1894
Polydesma collusoria (Berio, 1954)
Polydesma umbricola Boisduval, 1833
Procriosis dileuca Hampson, 1910
Pseudopais nigrobasalis Bartel, 1903
Pseudospiris paidiformis Butler, 1895
Rhynchina leucodonta Hampson, 1910
Rothia panganica Karsch, 1898
Schalidomitra ambages Strand, 1911
Schausia coryndoni (Rothschild, 1896)
Sciomesa mesophaena (Aurivillius, 1910)
Simplicia extinctalis (Zeller, 1852)
Soloe plicata Pinhey, 1952
Soloe tripunctata Druce, 1896
Spirama glaucescens (Butler, 1893)
Spodoptera mauritia (Boisduval, 1833)
Stictoptera antemarginata Saalmüller, 1880
Stilbotis ikondae Berio, 1972
Stilbotis nigroides (Berio, 1972)
Stilbotis persitriata (Berio, 1972)
Stilbotis perspicua (Berio, 1974)
Stilbotis pseudasciodes (Berio, 1977)
Tathorhynchus leucobasis Bethune-Baker, 1911
Tathorhynchus plumbea (Distant, 1898)
Thiacidas callipona (Bethune-Baker, 1911)
Thiacidas dukei (Pinhey, 1968)
Thiacidas fasciata (Fawcett, 1917)
Thiacidas leonie Hacker & Zilli, 2007
Thiacidas permutata Hacker & Zilli, 2007
Thiacidas roseotincta (Pinhey, 1962)
Thiacidas senex (Bethune-Baker, 1911)
Thiacidas smythi (Gaede, 1939)
Thyatirina achatina (Weymer, 1896)
Timora crofti Pinhey, 1956
Trigonodes hyppasia (Cramer, 1779)
Tuertella rema (Druce, 1910)
Tycomarptes inferior (Guenée, 1852)
Ulotrichopus eugeniae Saldaitis & Ivinskis, 2010
Weymeria athene (Weymer, 1892)
Xanthodesma aurantiaca Aurivillius, 1910
Xanthodesma aurata Aurivillius, 1910

Nolidae
Acripia kilimandjaronis Strand, 1915
Eligma bettiana Prout, 1923
Meganola reubeni Agassiz, 2009
Neaxestis aviuncis Wiltshire, 1985
Nolatypa phoenicolepia Hampson, 1920

Notodontidae
Anaphe dempwolffi Strand, 1909
Antheua eximia Kiriakoff, 1965
Antheua gallans (Karsch, 1895)
Antheua ornata (Walker, 1865)
Antheua woerdeni (Snellen, 1872)
Atrasana excellens (Strand, 1912)
Desmeocraera annulosa Gaede, 1928
Desmeocraera atribasalis (Hampson, 1910)
Desmeocraera cana (Wichgraf, 1921)
Desmeocraera forsteri Kiriakoff, 1973
Desmeocraera impunctata Gaede, 1928
Desmeocraera malindiana Kiriakoff, 1973
Desmeocraera schevenaria Kiriakoff, 1973
Desmeocraera tanzanica Kiriakoff, 1973
Desmeocraerula angulata Gaede, 1928
Epicerura pergrisea (Hampson, 1910)
Epicerura plumosa Kiriakoff, 1962
Epicerura steniptera (Hampson, 1910)
Euanthia venosa Kiriakoff, 1962
Eurystauridia olivacea (Gaede, 1928)
Eurystauridia picta Kiriakoff, 1973
Fentonina punctum Gaede, 1928
Graphodonta fulva (Kiriakoff, 1962)
Metarctina ochricostata Gaede, 1928
Paracleapa psecas (Druce, 1901)
Paradrallia rhodesi Bethune-Baker, 1908
Phalera atrata (Grünberg, 1907)
Phalera imitata Druce, 1896
Phalera lydenburgi Distant, 1899
Phalera postaurantia Rothschild, 1917
Phalera princei Grünberg, 1909
Plastystaura murina Kiriakoff, 1965
Polienus capillata (Wallengren, 1875)
Polienus fuscatus Janse, 1920
Scalmicauda molesta (Strand, 1911)
Scrancia danieli Kiriakoff, 1962
Scrancia quinquelineata Kiriakoff, 1965
Stemmatophalera semiflava (Hampson, 1910)
Stenostaura malangae (Bethune-Baker, 1911)
Xanthodonta debilis Gaede, 1928
Xanthodonta unicornis Kiriakoff, 1961
Zamana castanea (Wichgraf, 1922)

Oecophoridae
Stathmopoda daubanella (Legrand, 1958)

Plutellidae
Paraxenistis africana Mey, 2007
Plutella xylostella (Linnaeus, 1758)

Psychidae
Apterona valvata (Gerstaecker, 1871)
Chalia muenzneri Strand, 1911
Eumeta hardenbergeri Bourgogne, 1955
Eumeta ngarukensis Strand, 1909
Melasina bostrychota Meyrick, 1920
Melasina folligera Meyrick, 1920
Melasina siticulosa Meyrick, 1920
Melasina trepidans Meyrick, 1920
Monda nigroapicalis Joicey & Talbot, 1924

Pterophoridae
Agdistis kenyana Arenberger, 1988
Agdistis linnaei Gielis, 2008
Agdistis malitiosa Meyrick, 1909
Agdistis obstinata Meyrick, 1920
Amblyptilia direptalis (Walker, 1864)
Apoxyptilus anthites (Meyrick, 1936)
Bipunctiphorus etiennei Gibeaux, 1994
Emmelina amseli (Bigot, 1969)
Eucapperia bullifera (Meyrick, 1918)
Exelastis atomosa (Walsingham, 1885)
Exelastis montischristi (Walsingham, 1897)
Exelastis phlyctaenias (Meyrick, 1911)
Hellinsia emmelinoida Gielis, 2008
Hepalastis pumilio (Zeller, 1873)
Inferuncus pentheres (Bigot, 1969)
Inferuncus stolzei (Gielis, 1990)
Lantanophaga pusillidactylus (Walker, 1864)
Megalorhipida leptomeres (Meyrick, 1886)
Megalorhipida leucodactylus (Fabricius, 1794)
Ochyrotica bjoernstadti Gielis, 2008
Paulianilus madecasseus Bigot, 1964
Platyptilia farfarellus Zeller, 1867
Platyptilia molopias Meyrick, 1906
Platyptilia rhyncholoba Meyrick, 1924
Platyptilia sabius (Felder & Rogenhofer, 1875)
Platyptilia strictiformis Meyrick, 1932
Pselnophorus jaechi (Arenberger, 1993)
Pterophorus albidus (Zeller, 1852)
Pterophorus bacteriopa (Meyrick, 1922)
Pterophorus candidalis (Walker, 1864)
Pterophorus rhyparias (Meyrick, 1908)
Pterophorus uzungwe Gielis, 1991
Sphenarches anisodactylus (Walker, 1864)
Stenodacma wahlbergi (Zeller, 1852)
Stenoptilia kiitulo Gielis, 2008
Stenoptilodes taprobanes (Felder & Rogenhofer, 1875)
Titanoptilus laniger Bigot, 1969

Pyralidae
Endotricha consobrinalis Zeller, 1852
Pempelia morosalis (Saalmüller, 1880)

Saturniidae
Adafroptilum acuminatum (Darge, 2003)
Adafroptilum bellum (Darge, Naumann & Brosch, 2003)
Adafroptilum coloratum (Darge, Naumann & Brosch, 2003)
Adafroptilum convictum Darge, 2007
Adafroptilum hausmanni Darge, 2007
Adafroptilum incana (Sonthonnax, 1899)
Adafroptilum kalamboensis Darge, 2007
Adafroptilum mikessensis Darge, 2007
Adafroptilum permixtum (Darge, 2003)
Adafroptilum rougerii Darge, 2006
Adafroptilum scheveni (Darge, 2003)
Adafroptilum septiguttata (Weymer, 1903)
Antistathmoptera daltonae Tams, 1935
Antistathmoptera granti Bouyer, 2006
Antistathmoptera rectangulata Pinhey, 1968
Argema besanti Rebel, 1895
Argema kuhnei Pinhey, 1969
Argema mimosae (Boisduval, 1847)
Athletes gigas (Sonthonnax, 1902)
Athletes semialba (Sonthonnax, 1904)
Aurivillius arata (Westwood, 1849)
Aurivillius divaricatus Bouvier, 1927
Aurivillius fusca (Rothschild, 1895)
Aurivillius oberthuri Bouvier, 1927
Aurivillius orientalis Bouyer, 2007
Aurivillius xerophilus Rougeot, 1977
Bunaea alcinoe (Stoll, 1780)
Bunaeopsis aurantiaca (Rothschild, 1895)
Bunaeopsis bomfordi Pinhey, 1962
Bunaeopsis chromata Darge, 2003
Bunaeopsis dido (Maassen & Weymer, 1881)
Bunaeopsis fervida Darge, 2003
Bunaeopsis hersilia (Westwood, 1849)
Bunaeopsis jacksoni (Jordan, 1908)
Bunaeopsis licharbas (Maassen & Weymer, 1885)
Bunaeopsis oubie (Guérin-Méneville, 1849)
Bunaeopsis phidias (Weymer, 1909)
Bunaeopsis rendalli (Rothschild, 1896)
Bunaeopsis scheveniana Lemaire & Rougeot, 1974
Bunaeopsis schoenheiti (Wichgraf, 1914)
Bunaeopsis thyene (Weymer, 1896)
Campimoptilum boulardi (Rougeot, 1974)
Campimoptilum hollandi (Butler, 1898)
Campimoptilum kuntzei (Dewitz, 1881)
Campimoptilum pareensis Darge, 2008
Campimoptilum sparsum Darge, 2008
Carnegia mirabilis (Aurivillius, 1895)
Cinabra hyperbius (Westwood, 1881)
Cirina forda (Westwood, 1849)
Decachorda bouvieri Hering, 1929
Decachorda fulvia (Druce, 1886)
Decachorda pomona (Weymer, 1892)
Eosia insignis Le Cerf, 1911
Eosia minettii Bouyer, 2008
Epiphora albidus (Druce, 1886)
Epiphora bauhiniae (Guérin-Méneville, 1832)
Epiphora bedoci (Bouvier, 1829)
Epiphora boursini (Testout, 1936)
Epiphora brunnea (Bouvier, 1930)
Epiphora congolana (Bouvier, 1929)
Epiphora cotei (Testout, 1935)
Epiphora getula (Maassen & Weymer, 1885)
Epiphora imperator (Stoneham, 1933)
Epiphora kipengerensis Darge, 2007
Epiphora lecerfi (Testout, 1936)
Epiphora lugardi Kirby, 1894
Epiphora magdalena Grünberg, 1909
Epiphora manowensis (Gschwandner, 1923)
Epiphora mythimnia (Westwood, 1849)
Epiphora nubilosa (Testout, 1938)
Epiphora pelosoma Rothschild, 1907
Epiphora pygmaea (Bouvier, 1929)
Epiphora rectifascia Rothschild, 1907
Epiphora rotunda Naumann, 2006
Epiphora werneri Darge, 2007
Gonimbrasia alcestris (Weymer, 1907)
Gonimbrasia anna (Maassen & Weymer, 1885)
Gonimbrasia belina (Westwood, 1849)
Gonimbrasia cocaulti Darge & Terral, 1992
Gonimbrasia conradsi (Rebel, 1906)
Gonimbrasia hoehnelii (Rogenhofer, 1891)
Gonimbrasia miranda Darge, 2005
Gonimbrasia osiris (Druce, 1896)
Gonimbrasia rectilineata (Sonthonnax, 1899)
Gonimbrasia tyrrhea (Cramer, 1775)
Gonimbrasia ufipana Strand, 1911
Gonimbrasia ukerewensis (Rebel, 1922)
Gonimbrasia wahlbergii (Boisduval, 1847)
Gonimbrasia zambesina (Walker, 1865)
Goodia oxytela Jordan, 1922
Goodia unguiculata Bouvier, 1936
Gynanisa albescens Sonthonnax, 1904
Gynanisa ata Strand, 1911
Gynanisa carcassoni Rougeot, 1974
Gynanisa commixta Darge, 2008
Gynanisa jama Rebel, 1915
Gynanisa maja (Klug, 1836)
Gynanisa minettii Darge, 2003
Gynanisa nigra Bouvier, 1927
Gynanisa westwoodi Rothschild, 1895
Heniocha dyops (Maassen, 1872)
Heniocha marnois (Rogenhofer, 1891)
Heniocha puderosa Darge, 2004
Heniocha vingerhoedti Bouyer, 1992
Holocerina agomensis (Karsch, 1896)
Holocerina istsariensis Stoneham, 1962
Holocerina orientalis Bouyer, 2001
Holocerina smilax (Westwood, 1849)
Imbrasia epimethea (Drury, 1772)
Imbrasia ertli Rebel, 1904
Imbrasia orientalis Rougeot, 1962
Leucopteryx ansorgei (Rothschild, 1897)
Leucopteryx mollis (Butler, 1889)
Lobobunaea acetes (Westwood, 1849)
Lobobunaea angasana (Westwood, 1849)
Lobobunaea falcatissima Rougeot, 1962
Lobobunaea phaedusa (Drury, 1782)
Lobobunaea rosea (Sonthonnax, 1899)
Lobobunaea saturnus (Fabricius, 1793)
Lobobunaea tanganyikae (Sonthonnax, 1899)
Ludia delegorguei (Boisduval, 1847)
Ludia dentata (Hampson, 1891)
Ludia goniata Rothschild, 1907
Ludia hansali Felder, 1874
Ludia nyassana Strand, 1911
Ludia orinoptena Karsch, 1892
Ludia pseudovetusta Rougeot, 1978
Melanocera menippe (Westwood, 1849)
Melanocera parva Rothschild, 1907
Melanocera sufferti (Weymer, 1896)
Micragone agathylla (Westwood, 1849)
Micragone amaniana Darge, 2010
Micragone ansorgei (Rothschild, 1907)
Micragone cana (Aurivillius, 1893)
Micragone gaetani Bouyer, 2008
Micragone kalamboensis Darge, 2010
Micragone kitaiensis Darge, 2010
Micragone nyasae Rougeot, 1962
Micragone remota Darge, 2005
Micragone trefurthi (Strand, 1909)
Nudaurelia anthina (Karsch, 1892)
Nudaurelia bicolor Bouvier, 1930
Nudaurelia broschi Darge, 2002
Nudaurelia dargei Bouyer, 2008
Nudaurelia dione (Fabricius, 1793)
Nudaurelia eblis Strecker, 1876
Nudaurelia formosissima Darge, 2009
Nudaurelia hurumai Darge, 2003
Nudaurelia kiliensis Darge, 2009
Nudaurelia kilumilorum Darge, 2002
Nudaurelia kohlli Darge, 2009
Nudaurelia krucki Hering, 1930
Nudaurelia macrops Rebel, 1917
Nudaurelia macrothyris (Rothschild, 1906)
Nudaurelia maranguensis Darge, 2009
Nudaurelia mpalensis Sonthonnax, 1901
Nudaurelia myrtea Rebel, 1917
Nudaurelia nyassana (Rothschild, 1907)
Nudaurelia rectilineata Sonthonnax, 1901
Nudaurelia renvazorum Darge, 2002
Nudaurelia rhodina (Rothschild, 1907)
Nudaurelia richelmanni Weymer, 1908
Nudaurelia rubra Bouvier, 1927
Nudaurelia venus Rebel, 1906
Nudaurelia wahlbergiana Rougeot, 1972
Orthogonioptilum adiegetum Karsch, 1892
Orthogonioptilum fontainei Rougeot, 1962
Orthogonioptilum violascens (Rebel, 1914)
Parusta thelxione Fawcett, 1915
Parusta xanthops Rothschild, 1907
Protogynanisa probsti Bouyer, 2001
Pselaphelia flavivitta (Walker, 1862)
Pselaphelia kitchingi Darge, 2007
Pselaphelia laclosi Darge, 2002
Pselaphelia mariatheresae Darge, 2002
Pseudantheraea discrepans (Butler, 1878)
Pseudaphelia apollinaris (Boisduval, 1847)
Pseudaphelia flava Bouvier, 1930
Pseudaphelia roseibrunnea Gaede, 1927
Pseudimbrasia deyrollei (J. Thomson, 1858)
Pseudobunaea alinda (Sonthonnax, 1899)
Pseudobunaea bjornstadi Bouyer, 2006
Pseudobunaea bondwana Darge, 2009
Pseudobunaea callista (Jordan, 1910)
Pseudobunaea claryi Darge, 2009
Pseudobunaea cleopatra (Aurivillius, 1893)
Pseudobunaea elucida Darge, 2009
Pseudobunaea epithyrena (Maassen & Weymer, 1885)
Pseudobunaea heyeri (Weymer, 1896)
Pseudobunaea irius (Fabricius, 1793)
Pseudobunaea mbiziana Darge, 2009
Pseudobunaea miriakambana Darge, 2009
Pseudobunaea mwangomoi Darge, 2009
Pseudobunaea natalensis (Aurivillius, 1893)
Pseudobunaea pallens (Sonthonnax, 1899)
Pseudobunaea parathyrrena (Bouvier, 1927)
Pseudobunaea santini Darge, 2009
Pseudobunaea tyrrhena (Westwood, 1849)
Pseudoludia suavis (Rothschild, 1907)
Rohaniella pygmaea (Maassen & Weymer, 1885)
Tagoropsiella expansa Darge, 2008
Tagoropsiella ikondae (Rougeot, 1974)
Tagoropsiella kaguruensis Darge, 2008
Tagoropsiella mbiziensis Darge, 2008
Tagoropsiella rungwensis Darge, 2008
Tagoropsis flavinata (Walker, 1865)
Tagoropsis hanningtoni (Butler, 1883)
Tagoropsis rougeoti D. S. Fletcher, 1968
Tagoropsis sabulosa Rothschild, 1907
Ubaena dolabella (Druce, 1886)
Ubaena fuelleborniana Karsch, 1900
Ubaena lequeuxi Darge & Terral, 1988
Ubaena sabunii Darge & Kilumile, 2004
Urota sinope (Westwood, 1849)
Usta alba Terral & Lequeux, 1991
Usta angulata Rothschild, 1895
Usta subangulata Bouvier, 1930
Usta terpsichore (Maassen & Weymer, 1885)
Yatanga smithi (Holland, 1892)

Sesiidae
Aenigmina aenea Le Cerf, 1912
Camaegeria massai Bartsch & Berg, 2012
Euhagena nobilis (Druce, 1910)
Melittia chalconota Hampson, 1910
Melittia endoxantha Hampson, 1919
Melittia oedipus Oberthür, 1878
Melittia usambara Le Cerf, 1917
Pseudomelittia berlandi Le Cerf, 1917
Sura ruficauda (Rothschild, 1911)

Sphingidae
Acanthosphinx guessfeldti (Dewitz, 1879)
Acherontia atropos (Linnaeus, 1758)
Afroclanis calcareus (Rothschild & Jordan, 1907)
Afroclanis neavi (Hampson, 1910)
Afrosphinx amabilis (Jordan, 1911)
Agrius convolvuli (Linnaeus, 1758)
Antinephele lunulata Rothschild & Jordan, 1903
Antinephele maculifera Holland, 1889
Basiothia aureata (Karsch, 1891)
Basiothia medea (Fabricius, 1781)
Callosphingia circe (Fawcett, 1915)
Centroctena rutherfordi (Druce, 1882)
Chaerocina dohertyi Rothschild & Jordan, 1903
Chaerocina livingstonensis Darge, 2006
Chaerocina usambarensis Darge & Basquin, 2008
Chloroclanis virescens (Butler, 1882)
Coelonia fulvinotata (Butler, 1875)
Daphnis nerii (Linnaeus, 1758)
Dovania poecila Rothschild & Jordan, 1903
Euchloron megaera (Linnaeus, 1758)
Falcatula falcata (Rothschild & Jordan, 1903)
Hippotion celerio (Linnaeus, 1758)
Hippotion eson (Cramer, 1779)
Hippotion irregularis (Walker, 1856)
Hippotion moorei Jordan, 1926
Hippotion osiris (Dalman, 1823)
Hippotion rebeli Rothschild & Jordan, 1903
Hippotion roseipennis (Butler, 1882)
Hyles livornica (Esper, 1780)
Leptoclanis pulchra Rothschild & Jordan, 1903
Leucophlebia afra Karsch, 1891
Leucostrophus alterhirundo d'Abrera, 1987
Likoma apicalis Rothschild & Jordan, 1903
Likoma crenata Rothschild & Jordan, 1907
Litosphingia corticea Jordan, 1920
Lophostethus dumolinii (Angas, 1849)
Macropoliana ferax (Rothschild & Jordan, 1916)
Macropoliana natalensis (Butler, 1875)
Macropoliana scheveni Carcasson, 1972
Microclanis erlangeri (Rothschild & Jordan, 1903)
Neoclanis basalis (Walker, 1866)
Neopolyptychus compar (Rothschild & Jordan, 1903)
Neopolyptychus convexus (Rothschild & Jordan, 1903)
Neopolyptychus serrator (Jordan, 1929)
Nephele aequivalens (Walker, 1856)
Nephele bipartita Butler, 1878
Nephele comma Hopffer, 1857
Nephele lannini Jordan, 1926
Nephele monostigma Clark, 1925
Nephele rosae Butler, 1875
Pantophaea favillacea (Walker, 1866)
Phylloxiphia metria (Jordan, 1920)
Phylloxiphia punctum (Rothschild, 1907)
Phylloxiphia vicina (Rothschild & Jordan, 1915)
Platysphinx piabilis (Distant, 1897)
Platysphinx stigmatica (Mabille, 1878)
Poliana wintgensi (Strand, 1910)
Polyptychoides digitatus (Karsch, 1891)
Polyptychoides erosus (Jordan, 1923)
Polyptychoides grayii (Walker, 1856)
Polyptychopsis marshalli (Rothschild & Jordan, 1903)
Polyptychus andosa Walker, 1856
Polyptychus aurora Clark, 1936
Polyptychus baxteri Rothschild & Jordan, 1908
Polyptychus coryndoni Rothschild & Jordan, 1903
Praedora marshalli Rothschild & Jordan, 1903
Praedora plagiata Rothschild & Jordan, 1903
Pseudoclanis kenyae Clark, 1928
Pseudoclanis occidentalis Rothschild & Jordan, 1903
Pseudoclanis postica (Walker, 1856)
Rhadinopasa hornimani (Druce, 1880)
Rhodafra marshalli Rothschild & Jordan, 1903
Rufoclanis fulgurans (Rothschild & Jordan, 1903)
Rufoclanis maccleeryi Carcasson, 1968
Rufoclanis numosae (Wallengren, 1860)
Sphingonaepiopsis nana (Walker, 1856)
Temnora albilinea Rothschild, 1904
Temnora atrofasciata Holland, 1889
Temnora burdoni Carcasson, 1968
Temnora crenulata (Holland, 1893)
Temnora fumosa (Walker, 1856)
Temnora funebris (Holland, 1893)
Temnora griseata Rothschild & Jordan, 1903
Temnora hirsutus Darge, 2004
Temnora masungai Darge, 2009
Temnora natalis Walker, 1856
Temnora plagiata Walker, 1856
Temnora pseudopylas (Rothschild, 1894)
Temnora pylades Rothschild & Jordan, 1903
Temnora robertsoni Carcasson, 1968
Temnora sardanus (Walker, 1856)
Temnora scitula (Holland, 1889)
Temnora zantus (Herrich-Schäffer, 1854)
Theretra capensis (Linnaeus, 1764)
Theretra jugurtha (Boisduval, 1875)
Theretra orpheus (Herrich-Schäffer, 1854)
Xanthopan morganii (Walker, 1856)

Thyrididae
Arniocera amoena Jordan, 1907
Arniocera cyanoxantha (Mabille, 1893)
Arniocera elata Jordan, 1915
Arniocera imperialis Butler, 1898
Arniocera lautuscula (Karsch, 1897)
Arniocera lugubris Gaede, 1926
Arniocera sternecki Rogenhofer, 1891
Cecidothyris pexa (Hampson, 1906)
Chrysotypus dawsoni Distant, 1897
Chrysotypus reticulatus Whalley, 1971
Cornuterus nigropunctula (Pagenstecher, 1892)
Dilophura caudata (Jordan, 1907)
Dysodia amania Whalley, 1968
Dysodia fenestratella Warren, 1900
Dysodia fumida Whalley, 1968
Dysodia hamata Whalley, 1968
Dysodia incognita Whalley, 1968
Dysodia intermedia (Walker, 1865)
Dysodia lutescens Whalley, 1968
Dysodia vitrina (Boisduval, 1829)
Epaena inops (Gaede, 1917)
Epaena xystica Whalley, 1971
Hypolamprus janenschi (Gaede, 1917)
Kuja majuscula (Gaede, 1917)
Marmax smaragdina (Butler, 1888)
Marmax vicaria (Walker, 1854)
Netrocera diffinis Jordan, 1907
Netrocera hemichrysa (Hampson, 1910)
Netrocera setioides Felder, 1874
Rhodoneura disjuncta (Gaede, 1929)
Striglina minutula (Saalmüller, 1880)

Tineidae
Acridotarsa melipecta (Meyrick, 1915)
Amphixystis beverrasella (Legrand, 1966)
Amphixystis roseostrigella (Legrand, 1966)
Ateliotum resurgens (Gozmány, 1969)
Autochthonus chalybiellus Walsingham, 1891
Ceratophaga lichmodes (Meyrick, 1921)
Ceratophaga obnoxia (Meyrick, 1917)
Ceratophaga vastellus (Zeller, 1852)
Ceratophaga xanthastis (Meyrick, 1908)
Cimitra estimata (Gozmány, 1965)
Cimitra horridella (Walker, 1863)
Criticonoma aspergata Gozmány & Vári, 1973
Cylicobathra argocoma (Meyrick, 1914)
Cylicobathra chionarga Meyrick, 1920
Drosica abjectella Walker, 1963
Edosa crassivalva (Gozmány, 1968)
Edosa phlegethon (Gozmány, 1968)
Edosa pyroceps (Gozmány, 1967)
Hapsifera glebata Meyrick, 1908
Hapsifera hastata Gozmány, 1969
Hapsifera hilaris Gozmány, 1965
Hapsifera lecithala Gozmány & Vári, 1973
Hapsifera lithocentra Meyrick, 1920
Hapsifera luteata Gozmány, 1965
Hapsifera revoluta Meyrick, 1914
Hapsifera septica Meyrick, 1908
Hapsiferona glareosa (Meyrick, 1912)
Hyperbola hemispina Gozmány, 1969
Hyperbola hesperis Gozmány, 1967
Hyperbola mellichroa (Gozmány, 1968)
Hyperbola moschias (Meyrick, 1914)
Hyperbola phocina (Meyrick, 1908)
Hyperbola somphota (Meyrick, 1920)
Hyperbola zicsii Gozmány, 1965
Merunympha nipha Gozmány, 1969
Monopis addenda Gozmány, 1965
Monopis anaphracta Gozmány, 1967
Monopis immaculata Gozmány, 1967
Monopis megalodelta Meyrick, 1908
Monopis meyricki Gozmány, 1967
Monopis persimilis Gozmány, 1965
Monopis rejectella (Walker, 1864)
Monopis speculella (Zeller, 1852)
Organodesma merui Gozmány, 1969
Organodesma onomasta Gozmány & Vári, 1975
Pachypsaltis pachystoma (Meyrick, 1920)
Perissomastix christinae Gozmány, 1965
Perissomastix meruicola Gozmány, 1969
Perissomastix mili Gozmány, 1965
Perissomastix praxis Gozmány, 1969
Perissomastix szunyoghyi Gozmány, 1969
Perissomastix titanea Gozmány, 1967
Perissomastix topaz Gozmány, 1967
Phthoropoea pycnosaris (Meyrick, 1932)
Pitharcha atrisecta (Meyrick, 1918)
Pitharcha chalinaea Meyrick, 1908
Pitharcha fasciata (Ghesquière, 1940)
Proterospastis abscisa (Gozmány, 1967)
Rhodobates emorsus Gozmány, 1967
Scalmatica zernyi Gozmány, 1967
Silosca mariae Gozmány, 1965
Sphallestasis cyclivalva (Gozmány, 1969)
Sphallestasis epiforma (Gozmány, 1967)
Sphallestasis exiguens (Gozmány, 1967)
Sphallestasis nagyi (Gozmány, 1969)
Sphallestasis oenopis (Meyrick, 1908)
Sphallestasis pectinigera (Gozmány, 1969)
Sphallestasis saskai (Gozmány, 1969)
Sphallestasis spatulata (Gozmány, 1967)
Sphallestasis szunyoghyi (Gozmány, 1969)
Syngeneta sordida Gozmány, 1967
Tinea nesiastis (Meyrick, 1911)
Tinissa spaniastra Meyrick, 1932
Tiquadra lichenea Walsingham, 1897
Trichophaga cuspidata Gozmány, 1967
Trichophaga mormopis Meyrick, 1935

Tischeriidae
Coptotriche pulverescens (Meyrick, 1936)

Tortricidae
Accra plumbeana Razowski, 1966
Accra tanzanica Razowski, 1990
Actihema hemiacta (Meyrick, 1920)
Afrocostosa flaviapicella Aarvik, 2004
Afroploce karsholti Aarvik, 2004
Afropoecilia kituloensis Aarvik, 2010
Afrothreutes madoffei Aarvik, 2004
Bactra helgei Aarvik, 2008
Bactra jansei Diakonoff, 1963
Bactra magnei Aarvik, 2008
Bactra sinassula Diakonoff, 1963
Bactra tylophora Diakonoff, 1963
Basigonia anisoscia Diakonoff, 1983
Capua pusillana (Walker, 1863)
Cochylimorpha africana Aarvik, 2010
Cochylimorpha exoterica (Meyrick, 1924)
Cosmorrhyncha acrocosma (Meyrick, 1908)
Crimnologa perspicua Meyrick, 1920
Cryptaspasma caryothicta (Meyrick, 1920)
Cryptaspasma kigomana Aarvik, 2005
Cryptaspasma phycitinana Aarvik, 2005
Cryptaspasma subtilis Diakonoff, 1959
Cryptophlebia semilunana (Saalmüller, 1880)
Cydia leptogramma (Meyrick, 1913)
Cydia malesana (Meyrick, 1920)
Eccopsis incultana (Walker, 1863)
Eccopsis morogoro Aarvik, 2004
Eccopsis nebulana Walsingham, 1891
Eccopsis nicicecilie Aarvik, 2004
Eccopsis ochrana Aarvik, 2004
Eccopsis praecedens Walsingham, 1897
Eccopsis wahlbergiana Zeller, 1852
Epiblema riciniata (Meyrick, 1911)
Eucosma ioreas Meyrick, 1920
Eucosma xenarcha Meyrick, 1920
Eugnosta matengana Razowski, 1993
Eugnosta misella Razowski, 1993
Eugnosta percnoptila (Meyrick, 1933)
Eugnosta uganoa Razowski, 1993
Eugnosta unifasciana Aarvik, 2010
Eupoecilia kruegeriana Razowski, 1993
Geita bjoernstadi Aarvik, 2004
Gypsonoma paradelta (Meyrick, 1925)
Leguminovora glycinivorella (Matsumura, 1898)
Megalota archana Aarvik, 2004
Megalota rhopalitis (Meyrick, 1920)
Metamesia elegans (Walsingham, 1881)
Metendothenia balanacma (Meyrick, 1914)
Multiquaestia andersi Aarvik & Karisch, 2009
Multiquaestia fibigeri Aarvik & Karisch, 2009
Multiquaestia iringana Aarvik & Karisch, 2009
Multiquaestia purana Aarvik & Karisch, 2009
Olethreutes metaplecta (Meyrick, 1920)
Pammenopsis critica (Meyrick, 1905)
Paraeccopsis insellata (Meyrick, 1920)
Sambara sinuana Aarvik, 2004
Syntozyga triangulana Aarvik, 2008
Thylacogaster cyanophaea (Meyrick, 1927)
Tortrix dinota Meyrick, 1918
Tortrix platystega Meyrick, 1920
Tortrix triadelpha Meyrick, 1920
Trymalitis scalifera Meyrick, 1912

Uraniidae
Chrysiridia croesus (Gerstaecker, 1871)

Xyloryctidae
Eretmocera derogatella (Walker, 1864)
Eretmocera dorsistrigata Walsingham, 1889
Eretmocera miniata Walsingham, 1889

Yponomeutidae
Yponomeuta fumigatus Zeller, 1852
Yponomeuta morbillosus (Zeller, 1877)

Zygaenidae
Astyloneura difformis (Jordan, 1907)
Astyloneura meridionalis (Hampson, 1920)
Astyloneura nitens Jordan, 1907
Astyloneura ostia (Druce, 1896)
Neobalataea nigriventris Alberti, 1954
Saliunca assimilis Jordan, 1907
Saliunca meruana Aurivillius, 1910

References

External links 

Moths
Moths
Tanzania
Tanzania